The 1997–98 Montreal Canadiens season was the club's 89th season of play. The Canadiens made the playoffs and advanced to the Conference Semifinals after winning 4 games to 2 in Conference Quarterfinals against the Pittsburgh Penguins, their first playoff series win since the 1992–93 Stanley Cup title year. However, in the semifinals, they were swept in four games by the Buffalo Sabres.

Offseason

Regular season

Final standings

Schedule and results

Playoffs
Eastern Conference Quarterfinals
Montreal vs. Pittsburgh

'Eastern Conference Semifinals
Montreal vs. Buffalo

Player statistics

Regular season
Scoring

Goaltending

Playoffs
Scoring

Goaltending

Awards and records

Transactions

Draft picks
Montreal's draft picks at the 1997 NHL Entry Draft held at the Civic Arena in Pittsburgh, Pennsylvania.

See also
 1997–98 NHL season

References
 Canadiens on Hockey Database
 Canadiens on NHL Reference

Montreal Canadiens seasons
Montreal Canadiens season, 1997-98
Montreal